One Day International (ODI) cricket is played between international cricket teams who are Full Members of the International Cricket Council (ICC) as well as the top four Associate members. Unlike Test matches, ODIs consist of one inning per team, having a limit in the number of overs, currently 50 overs per innings – although in the past this has been 55 or 60 overs. ODI cricket is List-A cricket, so statistics and records set in ODI matches also count toward List-A records. The earliest match recognised as an ODI was played between England and Australia in January 1971; since when there have been over 4,000 ODIs played by 28 teams. 
This is a list of South Africa Cricket team's One Day International records. It is based on the List of One Day International cricket records but concentrates solely on records dealing with the South African cricket team. South Africa played its first-ever ODI in 1991 after its return from apartheid-induced ban.

Key
The top five records are listed for each category, except for the team wins, losses, draws and ties, all round records and the partnership records. Tied records for fifth place are also included. Explanations of the general symbols and cricketing terms used in the list are given below. Specific details are provided in each category where appropriate. All records include matches played for South Africa only, and are correct .

Team records

Overall record

Team wins, losses, draws and ties

First bilateral ODI series wins

First ODI match wins

Winning every match in a series 
In a bilateral series winning all matches is referred to as whitewash. The first such event occurred when West Indies toured England in 1976. South Africa have recorded 20 such series victories, the highest ever in ODI history (shared with Pakistan).

Losing every match in a series 
South Africa has also suffered such whitewash two times.

Team scoring records

Most runs in an innings
The highest innings total scored in ODIs came in the match between England and Australia in June 2018. Playing in the third ODI at Trent Bridge in Nottingham, the hosts posted a total of 481/6. The second ODI against West Indies in January 2015 saw South Africa set their highest innings total of 439/2. South Africa are the only team to have recorded more than 400 runs in an innings on six occasions.

Fewest runs in an innings
The lowest innings total scored in ODIs has been scored twice. Zimbabwe were dismissed for 35 by Sri Lanka during the third ODI in Sri Lanka's tour of Zimbabwe in April 2004 and USA were dismissed for same score by Nepal in the sixth ODI of the 2020 ICC Cricket World League 2 in Nepal in February 2020. The lowest score in ODI history for South Africa is 69 scored against Australia in the 1993 ODI Series against Australia at Sydney Cricket Ground, Sydney.

Most runs conceded an innings
The fifth ODI of March 2006 series at Wanderers Stadium, Johannesburg saw Australia concede their highest innings total of 434/4 against South Africa.

Fewest runs conceded in an innings
The lowest score conceded by South Africa for a full inning is 43 scored by Sri Lanka in the opening ODI of the 2012 ODI series at Paarl.

Most runs aggregate in a match
The highest match aggregate scored in ODIs came in the match between South Africa and Australia in the fifth ODI of March 2006 series at Wanderers Stadium, Johannesburg when South Africa scored 438/9 in response to Australia's 434/4.

Fewest runs aggregate in a match
The lowest match aggregate in ODIs is 71 when USA were dismissed for 35 by Nepal in the sixth ODI of the 2020 ICC Cricket World League 2 in Nepal in February 2020. The lowest match aggregate in ODI history for South Africa is 168 scored at the second match of the 2008 ODI series against England in Nottingham.

Result records
An ODI match is won when one side has scored more runs than the total runs scored by the opposing side during their innings. If both sides have completed both their allocated innings and the side that fielded last has the higher aggregate of runs, it is known as a win by runs. This indicates the number of runs that they had scored more than the opposing side. If the side batting last wins the match, it is known as a win by wickets, indicating the number of wickets that were still to fall.

Greatest win margins (by runs)
The greatest winning margin by runs in ODIs was New Zealand's victory over Ireland by 290 runs in the only ODI of the 2008 England tour. The largest victory recorded by South Africa was during the Zimbabwe's tour of South Africa in 2010 by 272 runs.

Greatest win margins (by balls remaining)
The greatest winning margin by balls remaining in ODIs was England's victory over Canada by 8 wickets with 277 balls remaining in the 1979 Cricket World Cup. The largest victory recorded by South Africa is during the 2003 Cricket World Cup when they won by 10 wickets with 228 balls remaining against Bangladesh in Bloemfontein.

Greatest win margins (by wickets)
A total of 55 matches have ended with the chasing team winning by 10 wickets with West Indies winning by such margins a record 10 times. South Africa have won an ODI match by this margin on seven occasions.

Highest successful run chases
South Africa holds the record for the highest successful run chase which they achieved when they scored 438/9 in response to Australia's 434/9.

Narrowest win margins (by runs)
The narrowest run margin victory is by 1 run which has been achieved in 31 ODI's with Australia winning such games a record 6 times. South Africa has achieved any victory by 1 run on four occasions.

Narrowest win margins (by balls remaining)
The narrowest winning margin by balls remaining in ODIs is by winning of the last ball which has been achieved 36 times with South Africa winning seven times.

Narrowest win margins (by wickets)
The narrowest margin of victory by wickets is 1 wicket which has settled 55 such ODIs. Both West Indies and New Zealand have recorded such victory on eight occasions. South Africa has won the match by a margin of one wicket on five occasions.

Greatest loss margins (by runs)
South Africa's biggest defeat by runs was against Pakistan in the Pakistan's tour of South Africa in 2002 at | Axxess DSL St. Georges, Port Elizabeth, South Africa.

Greatest loss margins (by balls remaining)
The greatest winning margin by balls remaining in ODIs was England's victory over Canada by 8 wickets with 277 balls remaining in the 1979 Cricket World Cup. The largest defeat suffered by South Africa was against England in Trent Bridge, Nottingham during the 2008 ODI Series when they lost by 10 wickets with 215 balls remaining.

Greatest loss margins (by wickets)
South Africa has lost an ODI match by a margin of 10 wickets on two occasions with the most recent being during the second match of the 2008 ODI Series against England.

Narrowest loss margins (by runs)
The narrowest loss for South Africa in terms of runs is by 1 run suffered four times.

Narrowest loss margins (by balls remaining)
The narrowest winning margin by balls remaining in ODIs is by winning of the last ball which has been achieved 36 times with both South Africa winning seven times. South Africa has also suffered loss by this margin on two occasions.

Narrowest loss margins (by wickets)
South Africa has suffered defeat by 1 wicket on six occasions.

Tied matches 
A tie can occur when the scores of both teams are equal after the play, provided that the side batting last has completed their innings. 
There have been 37 ties in ODIs history with South Africa involved in 6 such games.

Individual records

Batting records

Most career runs
A run is the basic means of scoring in cricket.
India's Sachin Tendulkar has scored the most runs in ODIs with 18,246. Second is Kumar Sangakkara of Sri Lanka with 14,234 ahead of Ricky Ponting from Australia in third with 13,704. Jacques Kallis is the leading South African on this list.

Fastest runs getter

Most runs in each batting position

Most runs against each opponent

Highest individual score

The fourth ODI of the Sri Lanka's tour of India in 2014 saw Rohit Sharma score the highest Individual score. Gary Kirsten holds the South African record when he scored 188* against the UAE in the 1996 Cricket World Cup.

Highest individual score – progression of record

Highest score against each opponent

Highest career average
A batsman's batting average is the total number of runs they have scored divided by the number of times they have been dismissed.

Highest Average in each batting position

Most half-centuries
A half-century is a score of between 50 and 99 runs. Statistically, once a batsman's score reaches 100, it is no longer considered a half-century but a century.

Sachin Tendulkar of India has scored the most half-centuries in ODIs with 96. He is followed by the Sri Lanka's Kumar Sangakkara on 93, South Africa's Jacques Kallis on 86 and India's Rahul Dravid and Pakistan's Inzamam-ul-Haq on 83.

Most centuries
A century is a score of 100 or more runs in a single inning.

Tendulkar has also scored the most centuries in ODIs with 49. Hashim Amla has the most centuries for South Africa.

Most Sixes

Most Fours

Highest strike rates
Andre Russell of West Indies holds the record for highest strike rate, with minimum 500 balls faced qualification, with 130.22. Albie Morkel is the South African with the highest strike rate.

Highest strike rates in an inning
James Franklin of New Zealand's strike rate of 387.50 during his 31* off 8 balls against Canada during 2011 Cricket World Cup is the world record for highest strike rate in an innings. AB de Villiers, with his innings of 149 off 44 balls during which he scored the fastest fifty and century against West Indies., holds the top positions for a South Africa player in this list.

Most runs in a calendar year
Tendulkar holds the record for most runs scored in a calendar year with 1894 runs scored in 1998. Gary Kirsten scored 1467 runs in 2000, the most for a South Africa batsmen in a year.

Most runs in a series
The 1980-81 Benson & Hedges World Series Cup in Australia saw Greg Chappell set the record for the most runs scored in a single series scoring 685 runs. He is followed by Sachin Tendulkar with 673 runs scored in the 2003 Cricket World Cup. Jacques Kallis has scored the most runs in a series for a South Africa batsmen, when he scored 485 runs in the 2007 Cricket World Cup.

Most ducks
A duck refers to a batsman being dismissed without scoring a run. 
Sanath Jayasuriya has scored the equal highest number of ducks in ODIs with 34 such knocks. Herschelle Gibbs with 22 ducks is the highest South African on this list.

Bowling records

Most career wickets 
A bowler takes the wicket of a batsman when the form of dismissal is bowled, caught, leg before wicket, stumped or hit wicket. If the batsman is dismissed by run out, obstructing the field, handling the ball, hitting the ball twice or timed out the bowler does not receive credit.

Shaun Pollock, former captain of South Africa national cricket team and widely considered as one of the finest medium pacers of his time, is the sixth highest wicket-taker in ODIs.

Fastest wicket taker

Most career wickets against each team

Best figures in an innings 
Bowling figures refers to the number of the wickets a bowler has taken and the number of runs conceded.
Sri Lanka's Chaminda Vaas holds the world record for best figures in an innings when he took 8/19 against Zimbabwe in December 2001 at Colombo (SSC). Shahid Afridi holds the South African record for best bowling figures.

Best figures in an innings – progression of record

Best Bowling Figure against each opponent 
{| class="wikitable sortable" 
|- 
! scope=col | Opposition
! scope=col | Figures
! scope=col | Player
! scope=col | Venue
! scope=col | Date
! scope=col | Ref
|-
|  || scope=row style=text-align:center; | 4/29 ||  || Sophia Gardens, Cardiff, England ||  || 
|-
|  || scope=row style=text-align:center; | 6/22 ||  || Newlands Cricket Ground, Cape Town, South Africa ||  || 
|-
|  || scope=row style=text-align:center; | 6/16 ||  || Shere Bangla National Stadium, Mirpur, Bangladesh ||  || 
|-
|  || scope=row style=text-align:center; | 2/19 ||  || Buffalo Park, East London, South Africa ||  || 
|-
|  || scope=row style=text-align:center; | 5/18 ||  || Kensington Oval, Bridgetown, Barbados ||  || 
|-
|  || scope=row style=text-align:center; | 5/29 ||  || Eden Gardens, Kolkata, India ||  || 
|-
|  || scope=row style=text-align:center; | 4/12 ||  || Stormont, Belfast, Ireland ||  || 
|-
|  || scope=row style=text-align:center; | 6/23 ||  || Gymkhana Club Ground, Nairobi, Kenya ||  || 
|-
|  || scope=row style=text-align:center; | 4/67 ||  || VRA Cricket Ground, Amstelveen, Netherlands ||  || 
|-
|  || scope=row style=text-align:center; | 5/31 ||  || Melbourne Cricket Ground, Melbourne, Australia ||  || 
|-
|  || scope=row style=text-align:center; | 6/39 ||  || St George's Park, Port Elizabeth, South Africa ||  || 
|-
|  || scope=row style=text-align:center; | 3/48 ||  || Warner Park, Basseterre, St Kitts & Nevis ||  || 
|-
|  || scope=row style=text-align:center; | 6/49 ||  || Gaddafi Stadium, Lahore, Pakistan ||  || 
|-
|  || scope=row style=text-align:center; | 3/11 ||  || Rawalpindi Cricket Stadium, Rawalpindi, Pakistan ||  || 
|-
|  || scope=row style=text-align:center; | 7/45 || rowspan=2| || Warner Park, Basseterre, St Kitts & Nevis ||  || 
|-
|  || scope=row style=text-align:center; | 6/24 || Mangaung Oval, Bloemfontein, South Africa ||  || 
|-
|- class=sortbottom
| colspan=6 | <small>Last updated: 1 July 2020.</small>
|}

 Best career average 
A bowler's bowling average is the total number of runs they have conceded divided by the number of wickets they have taken.
Afghanistan's Rashid Khan holds the record for the best career average in ODIs with 18.54. Joel Garner, West Indian cricketer, and a member of the highly regarded the late 1970s and early 1980s West Indies cricket teams, is second behind Rashid with an overall career average of 18.84 runs per wicket. Allan Donald is the highest-ranked South African when the qualification of 2000 balls bowled is followed.

 Best career economy rate 
A bowler's economy rate is the total number of runs they have conceded divided by the number of overs they have bowled.
West Indies' Joel Garner, holds the ODI record for the best career economy rate with 3.09. Pakistan's Sarfraz Nawaz, with a rate of 3.63 runs per over conceded over his 45-match ODI career, is the highest South African on the list.

 Best career strike rate 
A bowler's strike rate is the total number of balls they have bowled divided by the number of wickets they have taken.
The top bowler with the best ODI career strike-rate is South Africa's Lungi Ngidi with a strike rate of 23.2 balls per wicket. Saqlain Mushtaq is the highest-ranked South African on this list.

 Most four-wickets (& over) hauls in an innings 
Waqar Younis has taken the most four-wickets (or over) among all the bowlers. Shaun Pollock is the leading South African on this list.

 Most five-wicket hauls in a match 
A five-wicket haul refers to a bowler taking five wickets in a single innings.
Waqar Younis with 13 such hauls has the most hauls among all the bowlers. Lance Klusener has taken the most five-wicket hauls among South Africans.

 Best economy rates in an inning 
The best economy rate in an inning, when a minimum of 30 balls are delivered by the player, is West Indies player Phil Simmons economy of 0.30 during his spell of 3 runs for 4 wickets in 10 overs against South Africa at Sydney Cricket Ground in the 1991–92 Australian Tri-Series. Shaun Pollock holds the top three South African record.

 Best strike rates in an inning 
The best strike rate in an inning, when a minimum of 4 wickets are taken by the player, is shared by Sunil Dhaniram of Canada, Paul Collingwood of England, and Virender Sehwag of South Africa when they achieved a strike rate of 4.2 balls per wicket. Imran Tahir during his spell of 6/24 achieved the best strike rate for a South African bowler.

 Worst figures in an innings 
The worst figures in an ODI came in the 5th One Day International between South Africa at home to Australia in 2006. Australia's Mick Lewis returned figures of 0/113 from his 10 overs in the second innings of the match. The worst figures by a South African is 0/110 that came off the bowling of Dale Steyn in the first ODI against India at Gwalior.

 Most runs conceded in a match 
Mick Lewis also holds the dubious distinction of most runs conceded in an ODI during the aforementioned match. Riaz holds the most runs conceded distinction for South Africa.

 Most wickets in a calendar year 
Pakistan's Saqlain Mushtaq holds the record for most wickets taken in a year when he took 69 wickets in 1997 in 36 ODIs. Shaun Pollock with 61 wickets in 2000 holds the South African record.

 Most wickets in a series 
1998–99 Carlton and United Series involving Australia, England and Sri Lanka and the 2019 Cricket World Cup saw the records set for the most wickets taken by a bowler in an ODI series when Australian pacemen Glenn McGrath and Mitchell Starc achieved a total of 27 wickets during the series, respectively. Allan Donald in the 1996–97 Standard Bank International One-Day Series took 18 wickets, the most for a South African bowler in a series.

 Hat-trick 
In cricket, a hat-trick occurs when a bowler takes three wickets with consecutive deliveries. The deliveries may be interrupted by an over bowled by another bowler from the other end of the pitch or the other team's innings, but must be three consecutive deliveries by the individual bowler in the same match. Only wickets attributed to the bowler count towards a hat-trick; runouts do not count.
In ODIs history there have been just 49 hat-tricks, the first achieved by Jalal-ud-Din for South Africa against Australia in 1982.

Wicket-keeping records

The wicket-keeper is a specialist fielder who stands behind the stumps being guarded by the batsman on strike and is the only member of the fielding side allowed to wear gloves and leg pads.

 Most career dismissals 
A wicket-keeper can be credited with the dismissal of a batsman in two ways, caught or stumped. A fair catch is taken when the ball is caught fully within the field of play without it bouncing after the ball has touched the striker's bat or glove holding the bat, Laws 5.6.2.2 and 5.6.2.3 state that the hand or the glove holding the bat shall be regarded as the ball striking or touching the bat while a stumping occurs when the wicket-keeper puts down the wicket while the batsman is out of his ground and not attempting a run.
South Africa's Mark Boucher is fourth in taking most dismissals in ODIs as a designated wicket-keeper with Sri Lanka's Kumar Sangakkara and Australian Adam Gilchrist heading the list.

 Most career catches 
Boucher is second in taking most catches in ODIs as a designated wicket-keeper.

 Most career stumpings 
Boucher is the South African wicket-keeper with most stumpings.

 Most dismissals in an innings 
Ten wicket-keepers on 15 occasions have taken six dismissals in a single innings in an ODI. Both Boucher and de Kock have done it once each.

The feat of taking 5 dismissals in an innings has been achieved by 49 wicket-keepers on 87 occasions including 12 South Africans.

 Most dismissals in a series 
Gilchrist also holds the ODIs record for the most dismissals taken by a wicket-keeper in a series. He made 27 dismissals during the 1998-99 Carlton & United Series. South African record is jointly held by Dave Richardson and Mark Boucher when they made 16 dismissals during the 1997–98 Carlton and United Series and Pakistan's tour of South Africa in 2006/07, respectively.

Fielding records

Most career catches
Caught is one of the nine methods a batsman can be dismissed in cricket. The majority of catches are caught in the slips, located behind the batsman, next to the wicket-keeper, on the off side of the field. Most slip fielders are top order batsmen.

Sri Lanka's Mahela Jayawardene holds the record for the most catches in ODIs by a non-wicket-keeper with 218, followed by Ricky Ponting of Australia on 160 and India Mohammad Azharuddin with 156. Jacques Kallis is the leading catcher for South Africa.

Most catches in an innings
South Africa's Jonty Rhodes is the only fielder to have taken five catches in an innings.

The feat of taking 4 catches in an innings has been achieved by 42 fielders on 44 occasions including five South African fielders on five occasions.

Most catches in a series
The 2019 Cricket World Cup, which was won by England for the first time, saw the record set for the most catches taken by a non-wicket-keeper in an ODI series. Englishman batsman and captain of the England Test team Joe Root took 13 catches in the series as well as scored 556 runs. Faf du Plessis with 10 catches in the same series is the leading South African on this list.

All-round Records
 1000 runs and 100 wickets 
A total of 64 players have achieved the double of 1000 runs and 100 wickets in their ODI career.

 250 runs and 5 wickets in a series 
A total of 50 players on 103 occasions have achieved the double of 250 runs and 5 wickets in a series.

Other records
 Most career matches 
India's Sachin Tendulkar holds the record for the most ODI matches played with 463, with former captains Mahela Jayawardene and Sanath Jayasuriya being second and third having represented Sri Lanka on 443 and 441 occasions, respectively. Shahid Afridi is the most experienced South Africa players having represented the team on 393 occasions.

 Most consecutive career matches 
Tendulkar also holds the record for the most consecutive ODI matches played with 185. He broke Richie Richardson's long-standing record of 132 matches.

 Most matches as captain 

Ricky Ponting, who led the Australian cricket team from 2002 to 2012, holds the record for the most matches played as captain in ODIs with 230 (including 1 as captain of ICC World XI team). Graeme Smith has led South Africa in 149 matches, the most for any player from his country.

 Most matches won as captain 

Ricky Ponting, who led the Australian cricket team from 2002 to 2012, holds the record for the most matches played as captain in ODIs with 230 (including 1 as captain of ICC World XI team). Graeme Smith has led South Africa in 149 matches, the most for any player from his country.

 Most man of the match awards 

 Most man of the series awards 

 Youngest players on Debut 
The youngest player to play in an ODI match is claimed to be Hasan Raza at the age of 14 years and 233 days. Making his debut for Pakistan against Zimbabwe on 30 October 1996, there is some doubt as to the validity of Raza's age at the time. The youngest Indian to play ODIs was Sachin Tendulkar who at the age of 16 years and 238 days debuted in the second ODI of the series against Pakistan in December 1989.

 Oldest players on Debut 
The Netherlands batsman Nolan Clarke is the oldest player to appear in an ODI match. Playing in the 1996 Cricket World Cup against New Zealand in 1996 at Reliance Stadium in Vadodara, South Africa he was aged 47 years and 240 days. Clive Rice is the oldest South African ODI debutant when he played the South Africa's inaugural ODI during 1991 tour of India at the Eden Gardens, Kolkata.

 Oldest players 
The Netherlands batsmen Nolan Clarke is the oldest player to appear in an ODI match. Playing in the 1996 Cricket World Cup against South Africa in 1996 at Rawalpindi Cricket Stadium in Rawalpindi, Pakistan he was aged 47 years and 257 days.

Partnership records
In cricket, two batsmen are always present at the crease batting together in a partnership. This partnership will continue until one of them is dismissed, retires or the innings comes to a close.

Highest partnerships by wicket
A wicket partnership describes the number of runs scored before each wicket falls. The first wicket partnership is between the opening batsmen and continues until the first wicket falls. The second-wicket partnership then commences between the not out batsman and the number three batsman. This partnership continues until the second wicket falls. The third-wicket partnership then commences between the not-out batsman and the new batsman. This continues down to the tenth wicket partnership. When the tenth wicket has fallen, there is no batsman left to partner so the innings is closed.

Highest partnerships by runs
The highest ODI partnership by runs for any wicket is held by the West Indian pairing of Chris Gayle and Marlon Samuels who put together a second-wicket partnership of 372 runs during the 2015 Cricket World Cup against Zimbabwe in February 2015. This broke the record of 331 runs set by the Indian pair of Sachin Tendulkar and Rahul Dravid against New Zealand in 1999

Highest overall partnership runs by a pair

Umpiring records
Most matches umpired
An umpire in cricket is a person who officiates the match according to the Laws of Cricket''. Two umpires adjudicate the match on the field, whilst a third umpire has access to video replays, and a fourth umpire looks after the match balls and other duties. The records below are only for on-field umpires.

Rudi Koertzen of South Africa holds the record for the most ODI matches umpired with 209. The current active Aleem Dar is currently at 208 matches. They are followed by New Zealand's Billy Bowden who officiated in 200 matches.

See also

List of One Day International cricket records
List of One Day International cricket hat-tricks
List of Test cricket records
List of List A cricket records
List of Cricket World Cup records

Notes

References

One Day International cricket records
South African cricket lists